Jay Won (born March 18, 2000), better known as Sinatraa, is an American professional Valorant player. Won began his esports career as a competitive Overwatch player for Selfless Gaming, before signing with the San Francisco Shock of the Overwatch League (OWL) in the league's inaugural season. In his time with the Shock, he was named the league's most valuable player and won the 2019 Overwatch League Grand Finals. Internationally, he won the 2019 Overwatch World Cup (OWWC) as a member of Team USA and was named the 2019 OWWC most valuable player. 

Won left the competitive Overwatch scene in April 2020, signing with Sentinels to pursue a career in Valorant. He was suspended from competitive play for six months in March 2021 due to sexual abuse allegations.

Overwatch career

Professional career 
After being ranked second in North America and fifth in the world on Overwatch competitive mode, Won was invited to tryout for Selfless Gaming, an esports team based in Georgia, United States; however, he did not make the team. A few weeks later, Selfless invited Won to another tryout, and after head coach and co-owner Brad Rajani viewed his play, he was signed to the team. He left the team after it disbanded on July 7, 2017.

With the creation of the Overwatch League in 2017, scouts for the twelve franchises looked to sign players to fill their teams. After a bidding war between NRG Esports and Cloud9, Won decided to sign with the London Spitfire, Cloud9's Overwatch team. However, after more discussions with NRG and his parents, he changed his decision and signed a -per-year contract – three times the league's minimum salary – with NRG's San Francisco Shock. The signing reunited Won with head coach Rajani, who was the head coach of the Shock. However, as he was only 17 years old at the time, Won would not be eligible to play in league matches until he turned 18. Won made his Overwatch League debut on March 21, 2018, against the Florida Mayhem; the Shock lost the match, 2–3. Despite a meager performance in his debut, he soon established himself as one of the top damage players in the league. With himself and teammate Matthew "super" DeLisi becoming eligible to play around the same time, the team finished the second half of the season with a 11–9 record.

In the 2019 season, the compositions that teams primarily ran throughout the first three quarters of the season was three tanks and three supports; Won, who would usually play as the damage hero Tracer, transitioned to playing as the tank Zarya during this time. Through the first three stages, he helped the team post a perfect +28 map differential in Stage 2, reach all three stage finals, and win one stage title. In July 2019, just prior to the final stage of the season, the league implemented a role lock, in which teams were required to run a composition of two tank, two support, and two damage players, and Won primarily played as the damage hero Doomfist thereafter. He ended the season leading the league in hero damage dealt per 10 minutes and helped the team claim a second-best 23–5 regular season record, he was awarded the Role Star commendation for DPS and won the OWL Most Valuable Player award. After losing to the Atlanta Reign in the first round of the 2019 season playoffs, the Shock ran through the lower bracket to reach the 2019 Grand Finals. Won played in two of the four maps in a 4–0 win over the Vancouver Titans in the Grand Finals on September 29, 2019.

Citing a "lost passion for the game" Won retired from professional Overwatch on April 28, 2020.

The Overwatch League released a commemorative, in-game skin for Zarya on June 16, 2020, in honor of his MVP award. However, the OWL offered refunds for the skin and removed the OWL Championship and MVP badges on the skin in March 2021 after sexual assault allegations arose.

National team career 
Won was selected as a member of Team USA for the 2017 Overwatch World Cup (OWWC). Despite losing to Team South Korea in the quarterfinals, Won's performance throughout the World Cup led to NRG Esports CEO Andy Miller signing him to the Shock. Won was again selected for Team USA in the 2018 OWWC. The team claimed the top seed after the group stage, but they fell in the quarterfinals to Team United Kingdom. 

In the 2019 OWWC, Won was selected for Team USA for the third consecutive year. Playing with his Shock teammates Matthew "super" Delisi and Grant "moth" Espe, Team USA ran through the tournament, not losing a single match, and swept Team China in the OWWC finals on November 2, 2019, to claim USA's first OWWC title. Won was named the OWWC most valuable player, and, along with super and moth, became one of four people to win both Overwatch League and Overwatch World Cup titles.

Valorant career 
Won joined the Sentinels Valorant team in April 2020. Within a few months, Won solidified himself as one of the top players in the scene. Heading into the PAX Arena Invitational finals, the second-ever North America Ignition Series event, he led all players in assists with 122 — the only player at the event with over 100 assists — and had the fourth most kills-per-round at 0.90. Sentinels capped off the tournament by defeating Cloud9 in the final on July 26, 2020. He found another tournament win on August 2, as Sentinels defeated Team SoloMid at 30Bomb Summer Cup final. In Pop Flash, the fourth and final North American Ignition Series tournament, Won had his best performance in the group stage against Immortals, where he had an Average Combat Score of 402, 32 kills, and 11 first bloods. Won secured another tournament title after Sentinels defeated Team Envy, 3–0, at the Pop Flash grand final on August 30. At that point in his career, he had over 700 assists in professional play and was the only player in the world to record over 600. He went on to secure two more tournament titles with Sentinels, winning the JBL Quantum Cup in December 2020 and the Valorant Champions Tour North America Challengers One in February 2021.

After sexual assault allegations arose against Won in March 2021, he was suspended by Riot Games, as they worked through their investigation of the matter. Sentinels also suspended Won until their own internal investigation had concluded. On May 17, 2021, Riot announced in a competitive ruling that Won would remain suspended for a total period of six months, which would end on September 10, for "failing to fully cooperate" with their investigation. Sentinels picked up Tyson "TenZ" Ngo shortly after, replacing Won in the starting roster.

In April 2022, Won announced that he intended to return to the Valorant competitive scene. However, he was not signed to any team following the announcement and continued working as a content creator. In January 2023, he joined team Untamable Beasts, who played in the Valorant Challengers North America last chance qualifier.

Personal life 
Won was born on March 18, 2000, in Shoreline, Washington. His love for video games started at a young age, specifically with first-person shooters such as Halo 3, Call of Duty and Counter-Strike. The first time he made money playing esports was in 2014, when he won $200 in a Counter-Strike tournament. Won played baseball in high school and was going to play varsity as the starting second baseman, but he dropped out of traditional high school to pursue esports. He chose the name "Sinatraa" as his online name after rapper Logic fourth mixtape Young Sinatra: Welcome to Forever, appending an "a" at the end, since "Sinatra" was already taken.

Won threw the first pitch at the August 17, 2018, Oakland A's game.

In March 2021, Won was accused by his ex-girlfriend of sexual assault; Won denied the allegations. A police investigation followed, but there has been no update since Won's suspension from Valorant.

References

Further reading 

 

 
 

 
 

2000 births
American esports players
Living people
San Francisco Shock players
People from Shoreline, Washington